"My Tears Are Overdue" is a song by American country music artists George Jones.  Composed by Freddy Hart, it was released as the B-side to "You're Heart Turned Left (And I Was on the Right)" and rose to #15 on the Billboard country singles chart.  Although not a major hit, the song displays the virtuoso vocal talents that made the Texan one of the most respected singers in the business.  Jones was so hot on the charts in the early 1960s that several of his B-sides charted, including "Sometimes You Just Can't Win," "Big Fool of the Year," and "What's in Our Heart" (a duet with Melba Montgomery), and even hit the bottom of the pop charts with "Ain't It Funny What a Fool Will Do."

Chart performance

References

1964 songs
George Jones songs
United Artists Records singles
Song recordings produced by Pappy Daily